Feleacu is a commune in Cluj County, Transylvania, Romania. It is composed of five villages: Casele Micești (Kaszoly), Feleacu, Gheorghieni (Györgyfalva), Sărădiș (Seregélyes) and Vâlcele (Bányabükk).

Demographics

According to the 2011 census, the commune had a population of 3,923. Across time, the commune's population has evolved as follows:

Natives
Ștefan Micle

Infrastructure
 Guyed TV mast for FM-/TV-broadcasting and some lattice towers with directional antennas at 46°42'52"N 23°38'32"E.

Notes

Communes in Cluj County
Localities in Transylvania